

2022

2018

2014

2010

2006

2002

1998

1994

1990

1986

1982

1978

1976

1972

1968

1964

1960

1956

1952

1948

1944

1940

1936

1932

1928

1924

1920

1916

1912

1908

1904

1900

1896

1892

1888

1884

1880

1876

1872

1868

1864

1860

1856

1852

1848

1846

1842

1838

1834

1830

1826

1822

1818

References

 
Quadrennial elections
Elections